Google Digital Garage is a nonprofit program designed to help people improve their digital skills. It offers free training, courses and certifications via an online learning platform. Google Digital Garage was created by Google in 2015.

Courses 
The courses are broken up into modules. The Google Digital Garage offers over 100 online courses on various subjects, under the following categories:

 Data and Tech
 Digital Marketing
 Career Development
 Search Engine Optimization

Certifications 
Google grants certification upon completion of the Fundamentals of Digital Marketing course (taught by University and Interactive Advertising Bureau Europe).

References

External links 
 Official site

Google
2015 establishments in the United States
American educational websites
Educational technology companies of the United States
How-to websites
OpenCourseWare
Internet properties established in 2015